ISO 3166-2:TZ is the entry for Tanzania in ISO 3166-2, part of the ISO 3166 standard published by the International Organization for Standardization (ISO), which defines codes for the names of the principal subdivisions (e.g., provinces or states) of all countries coded in ISO 3166-1.

Currently for Tanzania, ISO 3166-2 codes are defined for 31 regions.

Each code consists of two parts, separated by a hyphen. The second part is two digits:
 01–25: regions as of early 2000s
 26: region created in 2002
 27-30: regions created in 2012
 31: region created in 2016

Current codes
Subdivision names are listed as in the ISO 3166-2 standard published by the ISO 3166 Maintenance Agency (ISO 3166/MA).

ISO 639-1 codes are used to represent subdivision names in the following administrative languages:
 (sw): Swahili
 (en): English

Click on the button in the header to sort each column.

Changes
The following changes to the entry have been announced by the ISO 3166/MA since the first publication of ISO 3166-2 in 1998.  ISO stopped issuing newsletters in 2013.

See also
 Subdivisions of Tanzania
 FIPS region codes of Tanzania

External links
 ISO Online Browsing Platform: TZ
 Regions of Tanzania, Statoids.com

2:TZ
ISO 3166-2
Tanzania geography-related lists